Josh Agle (born August 31, 1962) is an American artist, better known by the nickname Shag.

Biography
Josh Agle was born August 31, 1962, the first of nine children in Sierra Madre, California. He spent his early childhood in Hawaii, and later moved with his family to Los Angeles. While Agle was attending high school, his family moved to Utah. In the mid-1980s, he returned to California, to study economics and architecture at California State University, Long Beach.

He changed his major to graphic design and achieved his first successes as an illustrator while in college, with work for the magazines Forbes, Time and Entertainment Weekly. Also, he designed record covers for bands in the area. When he designed a cover for his own band, the Swamp Zombies, he first used the pseudonym Shag, composed of the last two letters of his first name and the first two letters of his surname, so as not to make it look as if the cover artist was merely a band member, but that the band was successful enough to hire a graphic designer.

In 1995, Agle was asked by Otto von Stroheim to contribute a painting to an exhibition. This picture quickly sold for $200 and caught the attention of the influential gallery owner Billy Shire. Agle was given the opportunity to present a series of other works in a 1996 tiki-themed art show at Shire's La Luz de Jesus Gallery in Hollywood. All of the pictures sold immediately and Shire was so excited that he organized an exhibition for Agle's works which was very well attended and which also quickly sold out.

Since then, Agle has had more exhibitions at various galleries in the United States, Japan, Australia and Europe. He had his first solo gallery exhibition in 1997, and his first New York gallery show in 2002. In 2009, he opened a "SHAG Store" in Palm Springs, which sells merchandise depicting Agle's works. A second Shag Store was opened in Hollywood in October 2015. He is also known for designing Tiki mugs.

Shag has designed projects for The Walt Disney Company and the Venetian Resort Hotel Casino in Las Vegas, as well as a 100-foot-long mural in the Georgia Aquarium.

Josh Agle lives with his wife and their two children in Orange County, California.

Selected books

Museum exhibitions and collections
 2010 - Art Shack, Laguna Art Museum, Laguna Beach, California
 2009 - Urban Superstars, Naples Museum of Modern Art, Naples, Italy
 2008 - Beyond Baby Tattooville, Riverside Art Museum, Riverside, California
 2008 - In The Land of Retinal Delights, Laguna Art Museum, Laguna Beach, California
 2007 - The Flesh Is Willing: New Work by Shag, Laguna Art Museum, Laguna Beach, California
 2007 - Rome Is Burning, Haas Fine Arts Center, Eau Claire, Wisconsin
 2005 - Pop Surrealism, Sangre De Cristo Art Center, Pueblo, Colorado
 2005 - Paradirama, Musee International des Arts Modestes, Sète, France
 2002 - The Sophisticated Misfit: Fifteen Years of Shag, Brea Museum, Brea, California
 2000 - Lowbrow Art: Up From The Underground, Art and Culture Center of Hollywood, Hollywood, Florida

See also
Lowbrow (art movement)

References

External links

Shag at M Modern Gallery
SHAG the store
ModCulture.com Interview with Josh "Shag" Agle
KittyKitty Interviews the Artists - Shag
Josh Agle at Jonathan LeVine Gallery
Shagwatch - Archiving exhibits, news articles and tracking the history of resold original paintings by Shag
Josh Agle Unauthorised - A gallery for the work of mid-century modernist artist Shag

1962 births
Living people
American artists
California State University, Long Beach alumni
People from Sierra Madre, California